Texas State Highway Loop 250 (Loop 250) is a bypass of northern Midland. The highway runs along the western, northern and eastern edges of the city. From the western terminus at I-20/SH 158/SH 349 to Bus. SH 349, the highway is a freeway.

Route description
Loop 250 begins at an interchange with I-20/SH 158/SH 349 in southwest Midland, with SH 158 beginning at concurrency with Loop 250. The highway runs near many industrial parks with exits for Industrial Avenue and BL I-20 (W. Wall Street). Near Thomason Drive, the freeway passes near many subdivisions on the city's west side. The concurrency with SH 158 ends at an interchange with SH 191 near Grande Communications Stadium and Security Bank Ballpark. Near Wadley Avenue, the freeway turns from a more north direction towards the east. The corridor of Loop 250 from Midland Drive to Garfield Street is the sight of many restaurants and shopping centers, including Midland Park Mall. Between Garfield Street and Bus. SH 349 (Big Spring Street), the southern frontage road serves as the northern boundary for Midland Airpark. Just east of Fairgrounds Road, freeway status ends and Loop 250 continues as a divided highway. Phases of new projects are planned and/or underway to extend the highway's freeway status further east and to the south, following the planned and existing route. The highway leaves the city limits of Midland just east of County Road 1160. Loop 250 has an interchange with BL I-20 before a terminus at I-20, east of Midland.

History

Loop 250 was originally designated on March 31, 1952 and ran from US 183 near the Montopolis Bridge to US 81 in north Austin. This highway was cancelled on August 17, 1954 with the mileage being transferred to US 183. The Loop 250 designation was used again as Spur 250 on August 27, 1959 as a connector route between Interstate 45 and U.S. Route 75 in Texas near Mossy Grove. This route was cancelled on October 8, 1965 with the mileage being transferred to FM 2989. The current Loop 250 was designated on August 31, 1977. On July 24, 1984, it replaced FM 1369, which was decommissioned, and the section of FM 868 from Loop 250 to SH 349.

Junction list

References

250
Transportation in Midland County, Texas
Freeways in Texas
Midland, Texas